Aurantiacibacter marinus  is a Gram-negative, ovoid to rod-shaped and non-motile bacteria from the genus Aurantiacibacter which has been isolated from seawater from the Yellow Sea in Korea.

References

Further reading

External links
Type strain of Erythrobacter marinus at BacDive -  the Bacterial Diversity Metadatabase

Sphingomonadales
Bacteria described in 2012